The Makassar revolt was an uprising in 1686 in the Kingdom of Ayutthaya during the reign of King Narai.

The revolt was led by a Prince of the Makassars who settled in Ayutthaya after the Dutch Empire had invaded his kingdom in the Celebes. The Makassar Prince, goaded by princes of Champa and supported by some Malays whose quarter neighbours his own, plotted to overthrow King Narai and seize control of the Kingdom with a puppet ruler; one of his own brothers, who would be pliant to his political and religious  demands, such as conversion to Islam. However, the plot was uncovered when another Champa Prince; a palace officer and  brother to the conspirators refused to participate in their upheaval and instead informed Narai's Greek minister Constantine Phaulkon, who alerts the King of the plot. Attempts of maintaining peace and order, as well as negotiations proved futile and the revolt was suppressed with a force consisting of Siamese and primarily English and French allies after intense fighting in Bangkok and Ayutthaya.

References

Ayutthaya Kingdom
1686 in Asia
17th century in the Ayutthaya Kingdom